In mathematics, the Weierstrass–Enneper parameterization of minimal surfaces is a classical piece of differential geometry.

Alfred Enneper and Karl Weierstrass studied minimal surfaces as far back as 1863.

The converse is also true: every nonplanar minimal surface defined over a simply connected domain can be given a parametrization of this type.

For example, Enneper's surface has , .

Parametric surface of complex variables
The Weierstrass-Enneper model defines  a minimal surface  on a complex plane. Let  (the complex plane as the  space), the Jacobian matrix of the surface can be written as a column of complex entries:

The Jacobian  represents the two orthogonal tangent vectors of the surface:

The surface normal is given by

The proofs can be found in Sharma's essay: The Weierstrass representation always gives a minimal surface. The  derivatives can be used to construct the first fundamental form matrix:

and the second fundamental form matrix

where  for all minimal surfaces throughout this paper except for Costa's minimal surface where .

Embedded minimal surfaces and examples
Costa's surface involves Weierstrass's elliptic function :

where  is a constant.

Helicatenoid 

Choosing the parameters of the surface as :

At the extremes, the surface is a catenoid  or a helicoid . Otherwise,  represents a mixing angle. The resulting surface, with domain chosen to prevent self-intersection, is a catenary rotated around the  axis in a helical fashion.

Lines of curvature

And consequently the second fundamental form matrix can be simplified as

Therefore, the two principal directions in the  space turn out to be

See also

 Associate family
 Bryant surface, found by an analogous parameterization in hyperbolic space

References

Differential geometry
Surfaces
Minimal surfaces